Austin Allen (born August 21, 1994) is a former American football quarterback. He played college football for the Arkansas Razorbacks and was their starting quarterback from 2016 to 2017. He was signed by the Tampa Bay Buccaneers as an undrafted free agent in 2018.

Early years
Allen attended Fayetteville High School in Fayetteville, Arkansas. He had 3,593 passing yards and 29 touchdowns as a senior and 4,150 yards and 46 touchdowns as a junior. He committed to play college football at the University of Arkansas, the same school his brother, Brandon, was attending.

College career
After redshirting his first year at Arkansas in 2013, Allen appeared in fives games in 2014 as a backup to his brother, Brandon. He completed eight of 16 passes for 153 yards with a rushing touchdown. He spent 2015 again as the backup to Brandon, appearing in three games and completing one of three passes with the one completion going for a touchdown. With his brother graduating, Allen took over as Arkansas' starting quarterback in 2016. Allen finished his first starting year with the Razorbacks with a 7–5 record under Coach Bret Bielema. The Razorbacks went to the Belk Bowl on December 9, 2016 against Virginia Tech. Allen played well to start the game leading his team into halftime with a 24–0 lead, but they ended up losing by score of 35–24.

Professional career
Allen signed with the Tampa Bay Buccaneers as an undrafted free agent on April 30, 2018. He was waived on September 1, 2018.

In 2018, Allen signed with the Memphis Express of the Alliance of American Football for the 2019 season. On November 27, he was selected by the Salt Lake Stallions in the third round during the inaugural AAF “Protect or Pick” Quarterback Draft. The league ceased operations in April 2019.

References

External links
Arkansas Razorbacks bio

1994 births
Living people
Sportspeople from Fayetteville, Arkansas
Players of American football from Arkansas
American football quarterbacks
Arkansas Razorbacks football players
Tampa Bay Buccaneers players
Memphis Express (American football) players
Salt Lake Stallions players